Methyl phenyl sulfoxide is the organosulfur compound with the formula CH3S(O)C6H5.  A low-melting white solid, it is an oxidized derivative of thioanisole. The compound is a prototypical chiral sulfoxide.  As such it has been prepared by asymmetric oxidation.

References